The Anglican Church of St James in East Lambrook, Kingsbury Episcopi, Somerset, England was built in the 12th century. It is a Grade II* listed building.

History

The church was built in the 12th century and has been changed and restored several times including a Victorian restoration in the 19th century.

The parish is part of the benefice of South Petherton with the Seavingtons  and the Lambrooks within the Diocese of Bath and Wells.

Architecture

The stone building has slate roofs with a small bell turret. It has a three-bay nave with a 19th-century porch. The chancel arch has been dated to 1190. The west gallery which is supported on cast iron columns.

The fittings include a Jacobean pulpit and an octagonal font. It still has box pews.

See also  

 List of ecclesiastical parishes in the Diocese of Bath and Wells

References

Grade II* listed buildings in South Somerset
Grade II* listed churches in Somerset
Church of England church buildings in South Somerset